In the Philippines, a constitutional convention is one of the three ways to amend the Constitution of the Philippines. Others include a People's Initiative and the Constituent Assembly. Article XVII, Section 3 of the Constitution says, "The Congress may, by a vote of two-thirds of all its Members, call a constitutional convention, or by a majority vote of all its Members, submit to the electorate the question of calling such a convention."

The 1987 constitution does not specify how delegates to a Constitutional Convention should be chosen. For past conventions, the legislation calling for the convention specified how the delegates would be chosen. In 1971, under an earlier constitution, Republic Act No. 6132 provided that delegates to a constitutional convention would be elected by the national legislative district, in a special election. The 1987 constitution specifies that any proposed amendments to the 1987 Constitution must by ratified by a majority of voters in a plebiscite.

The process of amending or revising the 1987 Constitution has become known as charter change.

List 
There have been five constitutional conventions in Philippine history:

See also
 Constitutional reform in the Philippines
 Constitution of the Philippines
 Federalism in the Philippines

References

Bibliography

External links
 The 1987 Constitution of the Republic of the Philippines
 Article XVII, The 1987 Constitution of the Republic of the Philippines
 The Constitution of the Republic of the Philippines (in Filipino and English Version)

Politics of the Philippines